Kalu Lal Gurjar (born 1 May 1953) is a Bharatiya Janata Party leader. He served as the Government Chief Whip in the Rajasthan Legislative Assembly from 2013 to 2018. He also served as the cabinet minister in Government of Rajasthan led by Vasundhara Raje and also served as Mines minister in Government of Rajasthan led by Bhairon Singh Shekhawat. He represents Mandal constituency of Bhilwara district in the assembly and has been elected as Member of the Legislative Assembly for four times.

Early life and education
Gujar was born on 1 May 1953 in Gurlan village of Rajasthan. He is son of Rupi Devi Gujar and Ganga Ram Gujar. He belonged to a poor family and both his parents were farmers. He completed his primary education from village Gurlan and he completed his middle education in another village of Rajasthan, named Gatarmala. Then he completed his secondary education from Pur Secondary School. Then he took admission in MLV Government College in Bhilwara and completed his Pre University Class. He continued his studies in the same college up to Ba(Hon's) LLB in 1976. Then he started practising in Bhilwara District Court and served as an advocate.

Political career 
He has been a Member of the Legislative Assembly from Mandal four times. He also served as Minister in Bhairon Singh Shekhawat ministry (1990–1992).

Personal life
Kalu Lal was married to Saroj Devi Gujar on 28 April 1977. He has four daughters.

See also 
 Bhairon Singh Shekhawat ministry (1990–1992)

References

Rajasthan MLAs 2013–2018
Living people
People from Bhilwara district
1953 births
State cabinet ministers of Rajasthan
Bharatiya Janata Party politicians from Rajasthan
Rajasthan MLAs 1990–1992
Rajasthan MLAs 1993–1998
Rajasthan MLAs 2003–2008